Cornelis de Bruijn or Cornelius de Bruyn (16521726/7), also formerly known in English by his French name Corneille Le Brun, was a Dutch artist and traveler. He made two large tours and published illustrated books with his observations of people, buildings, plants and animals.

Biography 
De Bruijn was born in The Hague.

During his first tour, he visited Rome, where he became a member of the Bentvueghels with the nickname Adonis, which is how he signed the bentbrief of Abraham Genoels II. He travelled in Egypt and climbed to the top of a pyramid where he left his signature. De Bruijn made secret drawings of Jerusalem, then part of the Ottoman Empire. His drawings of Palmyra are copies. De Bruijn reached Cyprus and stayed among the Dutch merchants in Smyrna and Constantinople. From 1684 he worked in Venice with the painter Johann Carl Loth, returning in 1693 to The Hague, where he sold his souvenirs. In 1698 he published his book with drawings, which was a success and was translated in several languages. Two examples have colored illustrations, the first color prints in history. Among his drawings were the first pictures of the interior of the Great Pyramid and Jerusalem that became known in Europe.

In 1701 he headed for Archangelsk. During his second tour he visited the Samoyeds in northern Russia. In Moscow he became acquainted with emperor Peter the Great: de Bruijn painted his nieces, and the paintings were sent to possible candidates for marriage.

In late April 1703, De Bruijn left Moscow along with the party of an Armenian merchants from Isfahan whose name he recorded as Jacob Daviedof.
De Bruijn and the Armenians sailed down the Moscow River, the Oka and the Volga, eventually reaching Astrakhan. Thanks to de Bruijn's short stopover in Nizhny Novgorod during the Easter holidays, we now have his description of that major center of the Russian Volga trade as it existed in 1703, with its Kremlin, stone churches, and a lively bar (kabak) scene.

Leaving the borders of the Russian state, de Bruijn arrived to Persia, where he made drawings of towns like Isfahan and Persepolis (1704–1705). He continued to Java and returned to Persia, Russia, and ultimately the Netherlands.

His drawings of Persepolis, a city destroyed by Alexander the Great, caused a sensation. The mayor of Amsterdam Nicolaes Witsen and a member of the Royal Society probably asked him to draw the city famous for its 40 columns. For a century, they were the best prints available to western scholars. De Bruijn was accused of plagiarism and his second book, Reizen over Moskovie was not such a success. From Amsterdam he fled to Vianen. De Bruijn was invited by a Mennonite silk merchant and died in Utrecht. It is not known when and where he was buried.

De Bruijn, who had read every Greek and Latin source he had been able to obtain, displays a convincing knowledge of subjects, at times going into the humorous. In Persia, he obtained a copy of Firdausi's Shahnamê, which he summarized and made accessible to the west.

Works 

Reizen van Cornelis de Bruyn door de vermaardste Deelen van Klein Asia (1698)
Corneille le Brun, Voyage au Levant (French translation, 1700)
Corneille le Brun, A Voyage to the Levant: or Travels in the Principal Parts of Asia Minor (English translation, 1702)
Reizen over Moskovie, door Persie en Indie (1711)
Voyages de Corneille le Brun par la Moscovie, en Perse, et aux Indes Occidentales (French translation, 1718)
Corneille le Brun, Voyage to the Levant and Travels into Moscovy, Persia, and the East Indies (English translation, 1720)
C. le Brun, An Abstract of M.C. Le Brun's Travels through Russia (1722)
Puteshestvie cerez Moskouviju Kornelija de Brujna (Russian excerpt 1873)
Aenmerkingen Over de Printverbeeldingen van de Overblijfzelen van het Oude Persepolis (1714)
Other English translations appeared in 1737, 1759, and 1873.

Notes

Sources 
 J.W. Drijvers, J. de Hond, H. Sancisi-Weerdenburg (eds.): "Ik hadde de nieusgierigheid". De reizen door het Nabije Oosten van Cornelis de Bruijn (ca.1652–1727) (1997 Leiden and Leuven)
 J. de Hond, "Cornelis de Bruijn (1652-1726/27). A Dutch Painter in the East", in: G.J. van Gelder, E. de Moor (eds.), Eastward Bound. Dutch Ventures and Adventures in the Middle East (1994 London/Atlanta), pp. 51–81
 G. Jurriaans-Helle (ed.), Cornelis de Bruijn. Voyages from Rome to Jerusalem and from Moscow to Batavia (Catalogue of an exposition in the Allard Pierson Museum, Amsterdam, 1998)

External links 

 Livius.org: Cornelis de Bruijn
 Cornelis de Bruijn, traveller and painter
 The Discoverer of Persepolis: Cornelis de Bruijn
 Reizen van Cornelis de Bruyn door de vermaardste deelen van Klein Asia, de eylanden Scio, Rhodus, Cyprus, Metelino, Stanchio, etc., mitsgaders de voornaamste steden van Aegypten, Syrien en Palestina : verrijkt met meer als 200 kopere konstplaaten ..., alles door den autheur selfs na het leven afgetekend (1698) in Dutch
 Cornelis de Bruins reizen over Moskovië, door Persië en Indië : verrykt met driehondert kunstplaten, vertoonende de beroemste lantschappen en steden, ook de byzondere dragten, beesten, gewassen en planten, die daar gevonden worden: voor al derzelver oudheden, en wel voornamentlyk heel uitvoerig, die van het heerlyke en van oudts de geheele werrelt door befaemde Hof van Persepolis, by den Persianen Tchilminar genaemt (1714) in Dutch

1652 births
1720s deaths
Artists from The Hague
17th-century Dutch explorers
Dutch travel writers
Members of the Bentvueghels
Explorers of Iran
Dutch Golden Age printmakers